The 1970 Cork Intermediate Hurling Championship was the 61st staging of the Cork Intermediate Hurling Championship since its establishment by the Cork County Board in 1909. The draw for the opening round fixtures took place on 25 January 1970. The championship began on 5 April and ended on 4 October 1970.

On 4 October 1970, Cloyne won the championship following a 2–18 to 4–06 defeat of Castletownroche in the final at Castlelyons Sportsfield. This was their second championship title overall and their first title since 1966.

Team changes

To Championship

Promoted from the Cork Junior Hurling Championship
 Kanturk

From Championship

Promoted to the Cork Senior Hurling Championship
 Youghal

Regraded to the South East Junior Hurling Championship
 Carrigaline

Results

First round

 Castletownroche received a bye in this round.

Quarter-finals

Semi-finals

Final

References

Cork Intermediate Hurling Championship
Cork Intermediate Hurling Championship